The Journal of Education is an academic journal, published by SAGE Publishing on behalf of the Boston University Wheelock College of Education & Human Development, with Hardin Coleman as its editor-in-chief. It bills itself as "the oldest educational publication in the country".

History
The Journal of Education was formed in 1875 by the union of the Maine Journal of Education, the Massachusetts Teacher, the Rhode Island Schoolmaster, the Connecticut School Journal, and the College Courant. The oldest of these, the Connecticut School Journal, had been published under various names since 1838. The merged journal was originally called the New England Journal of Education from 1875 to 1880 and (after several additional mergers) became the Journal of Education by 1892.

The Boston University School of Education took over as its publisher in 1953. By the early 1970s, the relevance of the journal had lagged, and the school revitalized it by turning it into a student-run journal, modeling it after student-run law review journals. In 2009, this decision was overturned, and the journal instituted peer review for its articles and editorial control by "eminent scholars" rather than students.

See also
American Journal of Education
Australian Journal of Education
European Journal of Education
Journal of Education Policy

References

Education journals
Magazines established in 1875
Boston University